The 1979 Norwegian Football Cup was the 74th edition of the Norwegian annual knockout football tournament. The Cup was won by Viking after beating Haugar in the cup final with the score 2–1. This was Viking's third Norwegian Cup title.

First round

{{OneLegResult|Skiold||1–2|Strømsgodset}}

|-
|colspan="3" style="background-color:#97DEFF"|Replay

|}

Second round

|}

Third round

|colspan="3" style="background-color:#97DEFF"|24 July 1979

|-
|colspan="3" style="background-color:#97DEFF"|25 July 1979

|-
|colspan="3" style="background-color:#97DEFF"|Replay: 2 August 1979

|-
|colspan="3" style="background-color:#97DEFF"|2nd replay: 8 August 1979

|}

Fourth round

|colspan="3" style="background-color:#97DEFF"|12 August 1979

|-
|colspan="3" style="background-color:#97DEFF"|Replay: 16 August 1979

|}

Quarter-finals

|colspan="3" style="background-color:#97DEFF"|26 August 1979

|-
|colspan="3" style="background-color:#97DEFF"|27 August 1979

|}

Semi-finals

|colspan="3" style="background-color:#97DEFF"|23 September 1979

|}

Final

 
Viking's winning team: Erik Johannessen, Bjarne Berntsen, Tor Reidar Brekke, Per Henriksen,
Tonning Hammer, Inge Valen, Svein Fjælberg, Svein Kvia, Finn Einar Krogh,
Trygve Johannessen, Isak Arne Refvik, Trond Ekholdt, Torbjørn Svendsen and Magnus Flatestøl.

Haugar's team: Steven Hopson, Rune Larsen, Leif Birkeland, Jens Vikanes, Terje Solberg, Dennis Burnett,
Harald Undahl, Eivind Hovland, Tor Nilsen, Dean Mooney, and Dag P. Christophersen

References
 Viking's match report

External links
http://www.rsssf.no

Norwegian Football Cup seasons
Norway
Football Cup